Parviz Sayyad (born 22 March 1939) is an Iranian-born American celebrated actor, director, translator, and screenwriter of Iranian cinema. He was one of the earliest television stars in Iran.

Early life 

Parviz Sayyad was born on March 22, 1939 in Lahijan, Pahlavi Iran.

Throughout the 1960s Sayyad starred in many plays that were adapted for television; and he was in the first Iranian television program titled Amir Arsalan alongside Mary Apick.

Career in Iran 

His first film, a comedy Hasan Kachal (1970), or "Hasan the Bald", is well remembered. He gained more fame starring in one of the oldest Iranian television series  (1975) playing the role of a well mannered, diplomatic sneaky and soft-spoken board member.

He is best known for his role as Samad, on the television series . The character Samad was a naive, street smart country boy (somewhat reminiscent of the American "Ernest" series). After this, Sayyad went on to star in the famous "Samad" film and television series. His character, Samad (or Samad Agha, as he demanded others call him), was a prominent comedic icon of Iran during the 1970s. The Iranian Revolution took place shortly after his 7th feature-length "Samad" film was released. Sayyad would spend the money he made on commercially successful films (such as Samad) in order to fund the creation of independent and intellectual films. 

His 1977 dramatic film Dead End entered the 10th Moscow International Film Festival. Other noteworthy roles include "Asdollah Mirza" on the television series, My Uncle Napoleon.

Career in the United States 
Sayyad migrated to the United States shortly after the Iranian Revolution, where he continued to act, write, direct and produce. He received a PhD from the City University of New York (CUNY). 

In 1983, he directed and starred in the film The Mission (Ferestadeh), which was entered into the 33rd Berlin International Film Festival; and won the Jury Grand Prize award (1983) at the Locarno Film Festival.

Sayyad is married to Parvin Sayyad and has two daughters.

Filmography

Television 
(As an actor)

 1967 to 1970 – , this was the precursor to the show Samad
 1974 – Kaaf Show (television series)
 1974 – 
 1975 – 
 1975 – 
 2012 – Homeland, season 3 (television series)

Film 
(As an actor)
1970 – Hasan Kachal (Hasan the Bald) 
1971 – 
1971 – Khastegar 
1972 – 
1972 – Sattar Khan
1972 – 
1973 – 
1974 – 
1974 – Mozaffar 
1974 – Maslakh
1974 – Asrare Ganje Darreye Jenni 
1975 – Zanburak 
1975 – 
1975 – Dar Ghorbat 
1976 – My Uncle Napoleon
1976 – Bon Bast (Dead End) directed by Parviz Sayyad; art direction and production design by Amir Farrokh Tehrani.
1977 – 
1978 – 
1979 –  
1983 – The Mission
1986 – Samad Goes to War 
1986 – On Wings of Eagle
1987 – Checkpoint
1988 – Samad Returns from the War 
2005 – Babak and Friends - A First Norooz
2008 – The Stoning of Soraya M. 
2016 – The Persian Connection

(As a director)

 1978 – Dar Emtedade Shab

See also
Saeed Khan Rangeela

References

External links
 Parviz Sayyad's Official Website
 
 at Persian Mirror

1939 births
Living people
Iranian comedians
People from Lahijan
Iranian male actors
Iranian screenwriters
Iranian film directors
Iranian film producers
Iranian male film actors
Iranian theatre directors
University of Tehran alumni
Iranian television directors
Iranian male television actors